Nature Calls is a 2012 American comedy film, released on November 9, 2012 and the DVD version on January 22, 2013. It stars Patton Oswalt, Johnny Knoxville, Rob Riggle, and Patrice O'Neal and features Maura Tierney.

The film is the final on-screen performance of Patrice O'Neal, who died in 2011 from complications of a massive stroke.

Plot
A group of children were gathered together and taken to forests for Boy Scouting in the U.S. Their parents were concerned initially but became grateful.

Cast
Patton Oswalt as Randy
Johnny Knoxville as Kirk
Rob Riggle as Gentry
Maura Tierney as Janine
Patrice O'Neal as Mr. Caldwell
Regan Mizrahi as Kent
Ivan Dimitrov as Ivan
Eddie Rouse as Little Eddie
Joshua Ormond as Leonard
Joseph Paul Kennedy as Gary

Awards and honors

References

External links
 
 

2012 films
2012 comedy films
American comedy films
Scouting in popular culture
2010s English-language films
2010s American films